Peniarth 51 is a Welsh medieval manuscript, in the hand of the poet Gwilym Tew, written in the period 1460–1480. Although it is known that Tew wrote other manuscripts, Peniarth 51 is the only entire manuscript that can be proven to have been his work. It is kept in the National Library of Wales, Aberystwyth, as part of the Peniarth Manuscripts collection.

The texts contained in the manuscript include a poetic vocabulary compiled by Tew, drawing on sources such as the Book of Aneirin, which he possessed at the time, and Bwystori Serch, his own translation of the French text Bestiaire d'Amour by Richart de Fornival.

During the 16th century the manuscript was the property of the poet and genealogist Gruffudd Hiraethog, who may have acquired it from his friend and teacher Lewys Morgannwg. The signature of poet Roger Kyffin (c.1587 - 1609) from Denbighshire is in the manuscript. It became part of Robert Vaughan's Hengwrt Library and then the Peniarth library.

References
Graham C. G. Thomas, A Welsh Bestiary of Love (Dulyn, 1988), tt. xviii-xix.

Welsh manuscripts
Peniarth collection
National Library of Wales collections